The Roman Catholic Archdiocese of Nagpur is a Latin rite Metropolitan archdiocese in central India, yet depends on the missionary Roman Congregation for the Evangelization of Peoples.

Its cathedral episcopal see is St. Francis de Sales Cathedral, in the city of Nagpur, in Maharashtra state.

Statistics 
As per 2014, it pastorally served 25,500 Catholics (0.2% of 12,360,000 total) on 59,042 km² in 34 parishes and 12 missions with 142 priests (48 diocesan, 94 religious), 798 lay religious (265 brothers, 533 sisters) and 23 seminarians.

History 
 Established on July 11, 1887 as Diocese of Nagpur, on territory split off from the Diocese of Vizagapatam.
 It lost territories repeatedly : on 1932.07.18 to establish the Apostolic Prefecture of Jubbulpore, on 1935.03.11 to establish the then Apostolic Prefecture of Indore, on 1951.06.14 to establish the Diocese of Sambalpur and on 1951.12.13 to establish the then Diocese of Raigarh–Ambikapur
 Promoted on September 19, 1953 as Metropolitan Archdiocese of Nagpur.
 Lost more territories thrice again : on 1955.05.08 to establish its suffragan Diocese of Amravati, on 1964.01.16 to establish the then Apostolic Prefecture of Raipur and on 1968.07.29 to establish the then Apostolic Exarchate of Chanda (now also a suffragan diocese of Nagpur)

Ecclesiastical province 
Its ecclesiastical province comprises the Metropolitan's own archbishopric and these Suffragan bishoprics, Latin Rite except one Syro-Oriental Rite:
 Roman Catholic Diocese of Amravati, its daughter
 Roman Catholic Diocese of Aurangabad
 Syro-Malabar Catholic Eparchy of Chanda, its only Eastern Catholic daughter

Episcopal ordinaries
(all Latin Rite, initially missionary members of a Latin congregation)

Suffragan Bishops of Nagpur
 Charles-Félix Pelvat, Fransalians (M.S.F.S.) (born France) (October 2, 1893 – death July 23, 1900)
 Jean-Marie Crochet (born France) (October 25, 1900 – death June 6, 1903)
 Etienne-Marie Bonaventure, M.S.F.S. (born France) (September 17, 1904 – death March 12, 1907)
 François-Etienne Coppel, M.S.F.S. (born France) (June 22, 1907 – death March 16, 1933)
 Louis-François Gayet, M.S.F.S. (born France) (February 1, 1934 – death August 26, 1950)
 Eugene D’Souza, M.S.F.S. (first Indian incumbent) (July 12, 1951 – September 19, 1953 see below)

Metropolitan Archbishops of Nagpur
 Eugene D’Souza, M.S.F.S. (see above September 19, 1953 – September 13, 1963), later Metropolitan Archbishop of Bhopal (India) (1963.09.13 – death 1994.03.26)
 Leonard Joseph Raymond (January 16, 1964 – death February 1, 1974) (born Pakistan), previously Bishop of Allahabad (India) (1947.04.10 – 1964.01.16)
 Leobard D’Souza (July 1, 1975 – retired January 17, 1998), also Vice-President of Conference of Catholic Bishops of India (1988–1991); previously Titular Bishop of Caput Cilla (1964.11.12 – 1965.12.17) & Coadjutor Bishop of Jabalpur (India) (1964.11.12 – 1965.12.17), succeeding as Bishop of Jabalpur (1965.12.17 – 1975.07.01)
 Auxiliary Bishop: Sylvester Monteiro (1993.12.06 – 1999.02.09), Titular Bishop of Scampa (1993.12.06 – 1999.02.09); next Bishop of suffragan Aurangabad (India) (1999.02.09 – death 2005.08.14)
 Abraham Viruthakulangara (January 17, 1998 – April 19, 2018), previously Bishop of Khandwa (India) (1977.03.04 – 1998.01.17).
Elias Joseph Gonsalves – 2018.12.03 – present

Saints and causes for canonisation
 Servant of God Sr. Marie Gertrude Gros, SMMI

References

Sources and external links 

 GCatholic.org, with incumbent biography links – data for all sections 
 Catholic Hierarchy 

Roman Catholic dioceses in India
Organisations based in Nagpur
Christianity in Maharashtra
Religious organizations established in 1887
Roman Catholic dioceses and prelatures established in the 19th century
1887 establishments in India